Sabatinca is a genus of small primitive metallic moths in the family Micropterigidae. Palaeomicra and Micropardalis were both established as subgenera of Sabatinca, but were both raised to generic level by Joël Minet in 1985. However, in 2014 both these genera, Palaeomicra and Micropardalis, were recognised by George Gibbs as synonyms of Sabatinca. Extinct species in this genus are known from the Cretaceous Burmese amber.

Selected species
Sabatinca aemula Philpott, 1924 
Sabatinca aenea Hudson, 1923 
Sabatinca aurantissima Gibbs, 2014
Sabatinca aurella Hudson, 1918
Sabatinca bimacula Gibbs, 2014
Sabatinca calliarcha Meyrick, 1912
Sabatinca caustica Meyrick, 1912
Sabatinca chalcophanes (Meyrick, 1885)
Sabatinca chrysargyra (Meyrick, 1885)
Sabatinca delobelli Viette, 1978
Sabatinca demissa Philpott, 1923
Sabatinca doroxena (Meyrick, 1888)
Sabatinca heighwayi Philpott, 1927
Sabatinca ianthina Philpott, 1921
Sabatinca incongruella Walker, 1863
Sabatinca lucilia Clarke, 1920
†Sabatinca perveta (Cockerell, 1919)
Sabatinca pluvialis Gibbs, 2014
Sabatinca quadrijuga Meyrick, 1912
Sabatinca weheka Gibbs, 2014
†Sabatinca pouilloni Ngô -Muller et al., 2020

References

Micropterigidae
Moth genera